25 Years is a compilation album by the progressive bluegrass band Country Gentlemen,  released in 1980 by Rebel Records. The compilation, made up of 24 tracks, aims to capture the first 25 years of the history of the band with all various incarnations of the Country Gentlemen.

Track listing

Personnel
 Charlie Waller – guitar, vocals
 Doyle Lawson – mandolin, vocals
 James Bailey – banjo, vocals
 Bill Yates – bass, vocals
 Spider Gillam – bass
 Ed Ferris – bass, vocals
 Eddie Adcock – banjo, vocals
 John Duffey – mandolin, vocals
 Tom Gray – bass, vocals

References

External links
 The best song of the decade LPDiscography.com

1980 greatest hits albums
The Country Gentlemen compilation albums
Rebel Records compilation albums